The Canon ELPH (also known as IXUS in Europe and IXY in Japan) series includes several popular compact point and shoot cameras built between 1996 and 2002. 1

Film Format
All ELPH cameras used the Advanced Photo System (APS) film format and were known for being very compact and stylish. The companion line of digital cameras, the Digital ELPH series, remains in production.

Models

See also
Canon Digital IXUS
Canon PowerShot
List of Canon products

Canon ELPH cameras
Point-and-shoot cameras